The Need for Roots: prelude towards a declaration of duties towards mankind is a book by Simone Weil. It was first published in French in 1949, titled L'Enracinement. The first English translation was published in 1952. Like all of Weil's books, it was published posthumously.

The work diagnoses the causes of the social, cultural and spiritual malaise which Weil saw as afflicting 20th century civilisation, particularly Europe but also the rest of the world.  'Uprootedness' is defined as a near universal condition resulting from the destruction of ties with the past and the dissolution of community.  Weil specifies the requirements that must be met so that peoples can once again feel rooted, in a cultural and spiritual sense, to their environment and to both the  past and to expectations for the future. The book discusses the political,  cultural and spiritual currents that ought to be nurtured so that people have access to sources of energy which will help them lead fulfilling, joyful and morally good lives. A leading theme is the need to recognise the spiritual nature of work.

The Need for Roots is regarded as Weil's best known work and has provoked a variety of responses, from being described as a work of "exceptional originality and breadth of human sympathy" to "a collection of egregious nonsense."

Background

The book was written in the early months of 1943. Its initial form was a report which Weil had been asked to write for the Free French Resistance movement  concerning the possibilities for effecting a regeneration in France once the Germans had been driven back. The work was originally submitted along with a shorter companion essay called Draft for a statement of human obligations. 
"Spirituality of work", a leading theme in the book, was a concept that had occupied Weil throughout her career. According to biographer Richard Rees, her whole life's work can be viewed as an attempt to elucidate the concept, which she saw as the one great original idea of the West. 
  Weil presented physical labour as the type of work most suited to develop a direct connection with God. Her analysis was informed by a year-long stretch as a factory hand and by several periods working as an agricultural labourer.

Synopsis
The book is divided into three parts. Part 1 is subdivided into fourteen sections, each dealing with a specific human need. Collectively these are referred to as 'needs of the soul'. Part 2 is subdivided into three sections, dealing with the concept of uprootedness in relation to urban life, to rural life and to nationhood. Part 3 is undivided and discusses the possibilities for inspiring a nation. Only a small part of the book discusses the specific solutions that were of unique applicability to France in the 1940s. Most of the work discusses the general case and is of broad and lasting relevance.

Part 1: The Needs of the Soul
Part 1 begins with a discussion of obligations and rights. Weil asserts that obligations are more fundamental than rights, as a right is only meaningful insofar as others fulfil their obligation to respect it. A man alone in the universe, she says, would have obligations but no rights. Rights are therefore "subordinate and relative" to obligations. Weil says that those directing the French Revolution were mistaken in basing their ideas for a new society on the notion of rights rather than obligations, suggesting that a system based on obligations would have been better. Weil claims that while rights are subject to varying conditions, obligations are "eternal", "situated above this world" and "independent of conditions", applying to all human beings. The actual activities which obligations require us to perform, however, may vary depending on circumstances. The most fundamental obligation  involves respecting the essential needs of others - the "needs of the soul".

Weil backs up her ideas on the needs of the soul by mentioning that Christian, ancient Egyptian and other traditions have held similar moral views throughout history, particularly on the obligation to help those suffering from hunger. This, Weil says, should serve as a model for other needs of the soul. Weil also makes a distinction between physical needs (such as for food, heating and medical attention) and non-physical needs that are concerned with the "moral side" of life. Both kinds are vital, and the deprivation of these needs causes one to fall into a state "more or less resembling death".

Weil goes into some detail on collectives. She says that obligations are not binding to collectives, but to the individuals of which the collective is composed. Collectives should be respected, not for their own sake, but because they are 'food for mankind'. Collectives that are not 'food for mankind' - harmful or useless collectives - should be removed.

The remainder of Part 1 is divided into sections discussing the essential needs of the soul, which Weil says correspond to basic bodily needs like the requirements for food, warmth and  medicine. She says such needs can mostly be grouped into antithetical pairs, such as the needs for rest and activity, or for warmth and coolness, and that they are best satisfied when a balance is struck allowing both needs to be met in turn. In communities where all essential needs are satisfied there will be a "flowering of fraternity, joy, beauty and happiness".

Order
Order is introduced as a preeminent need. Weil defines order as an arrangement of society which minimises the situations one encounters where a choice has to be made between incompatible obligations.

Liberty
Liberty is described as the ability to make meaningful choices. It is recognized that societies must inevitably have rules for the common good which restrict freedom to a certain degree.  Weil argues that these rules do not truly diminish one's liberty if they meet certain conditions; if their purpose is easily grasped and there aren't too many, then mature individuals of good will should not find the rules oppressive. This is illustrated by describing the habit of "not eating disgusting or dangerous things" as not being an infringement of liberty. The only people who would feel restricted by such rules are characterized as childlike.

Obedience
Obedience is defined as an essential need of the soul as long as it's the sort of obedience that arises from freely given consent to obey a given set of rules or the commands of a leader. Obedience motivated by a fear of penalties or a desire for reward is mere servility and of no value. The author writes that it's important that the social structure has a common goal, the essence of which can be grasped by all, so people can appreciate the purpose of the rules and orders.

Responsibility
Weil says that everyone has a need to feel useful and even essential to others. They should ideally make at least some decisions and have opportunity to show initiative as well as carrying out work. She says the unemployed person is starved of this need. Weil advises that for people of a fairly strong character this need extends to a requirement to take a leadership role for at least part of their lives, and that a flourishing community life will provide sufficient opportunities for all to have their turn commanding others.

Equality
Equality is an essential need when defined as a recognition that everyone is entitled to an equal amount of respect as a human being, regardless of any differences. Weil advises that an ideal society ought to involve a balance of equality and inequality. While there should be social mobility both up and down,  if children have a truly equal chance for self-advancement based purely on their own abilities, everyone who ends up in a low grade job will be seen as being there due to their own shortcomings. Weil says an ideal social organisation would involve holding those who enjoy power and privilege to a higher standard of conduct than those who don't; in particular a crime from an employer and against employees should be punished much more severely than a crime from an employee against his or her employer.

Hierarchism
Weil writes of the importance of a system of hierarchy in which one feels devotion towards superiors, not as individuals, but as symbols. Hierarchism represents the order of the heavenly realm, and it helps one to fit into their moral place.

Honour
Honour is the need for a special sort of respect over and above the respect automatically due to every human being. An individual's honour relates to how well their conduct measures up to certain criteria, which vary according to the social milieu inhabited by the individual. The need for honour is best satisfied when people are able to participate in a shared noble tradition. For a profession to satisfy this need, it should have an association able to "keep alive the memory of all the store of nobility, heroism, probity, generosity and genius spent in the exercise of that profession".

Punishment
Two sorts of necessary punishment are discussed. Disciplinary punishments help to reinforce an individual's good conscience, by providing external support in the battle against falling into vice. The second and most essential sort of punishment is the punitive. Weil considers that in a sense the commission of a crime puts the individual outside of the chain of obligations that form the good society, and that punishment is essential to re-integrate the individual into lawful society.

Freedom of Opinion
Weil says it's essential for people to be free to express any opinion or idea. However she advises that very harmful views should not be expressed in the part of the media that is responsible for shaping public opinion.

Security
Security is described as freedom from fear and terror, except under brief and exceptional circumstances. She says that permanent fear causes a "semi-paralysis of the soul".

Risk
Weil argues that risk, in the right amount, can be enough to protect one from a detrimental type of boredom and teach one how to appropriately deal with fear, but not be so much that one is overcome with fear.

Private Property
Weil writes that the soul suffers feelings of isolation if deprived of objects to call its own, which can serve as extensions of the body. She advises that where possible people should be able to own their own homes and the tools of their trade.

Collective Property
The need for collective property is satisfied when people, from the richest to the poorest,  feel a shared sense of ownership as well as enjoyment of public buildings, land and events.

Truth
Weil asserts the need for truth is the most sacred of all needs. It is compromised when people don't have access to reliable and accurate sources of information. Because working people often lack the time to verify what they read in books and the mass media,  writers who introduce avoidable errors should be held accountable. Propaganda should be banned and people who deliberately lie in the media should be liable to severe penalties.

Part 2: Uprootedness
Weil conceives  uprootedness as a condition where people lack deep and living connections with their environment  It is aggravated if people also lack participation in community life. Uprooted people lack connections with the past and a sense of their own integral place in the world. Uprootedness has many causes, with two of the most potent being conquest of a nation by foreigners and the growing influence of money which tends to corrode most other forms of motivation.

Uprootedness in Towns

Weil asserts that in 20th century France and elsewhere the condition of uprootedness is most advanced in towns, especially among the lower paid workers who have a total dependence on money. Weil writes their uprootedness is so severe it's effectively as though they had been banished from their own country and then temporally reinstated on sufferance, forced by oppressive employers to have almost their entire attention taken up with drudgery and piecework. For the urban poor without work it's even worse, unemployment is described as "uprootedness squared."

The gulf between high culture from the mass of the people that has been widening since the renaissance is another factor contributing to up rootedness. 
Education now has only limited effect in helping to create roots as academic culture has lost its connection both with this world and the next. Many academics have become obsessed with learning not for a desire for knowledge for its own sake but due to the utility it offers for attaining social prestige.

Weil discussed how uprootedness is a self-propagating condition, giving the example of the Romans and Germans after World War I as uprooted people who set about uprooting others. Whoever is rooted doesn't uproot others - Weil opines that the worst examples of misconduct by the Spanish and English during the colonial age were from adventurers who lacked deep connections with the life of their own countries.  Both the left and right include activists who want the working class to be rooted again, but on the left there is sizeable contingent who merely want everyone to be reduced to the same level of unrootedness as the proletariats,  and on the right a section who want the workers to remain unrooted the better to be able to exploit them. Disunity prevents good intentioned activists from having much effect.

Another factor hampering reform efforts is the tendency of human nature not to pay attention to misfortune - she discusses how unions often spend most of their energies looking out for relatively well off special interests, neglecting the weak who were being most oppressed, such as youth, women and  immigrant workers.

Weil proposes various measures to address urban uprootedness. She says little can be done for uprooted adults, but it would be easier to rescue the next generation. One of her first suggestions is to eliminate psychic shock experienced by young workers when they transition from school where authority figures care about their wellbeing to the world of work where they're effectively just a "cog in a machine."  Another ill to remedy is the exclusion of workers from an imaginative share in their companies's strategy.

Machines should be designed with the needs of the workmen in mind, not just the demands of cost efficient production.  The author suggests that if people have a suitable introduction to work as children, who tend to see the workplace as an intriguing world reserved for adults, then their future experience of work would forever be "lit up by poetry". 
Weil also advises that a revival of  apprenticeships and the  original Tour de France would be of great value.

Weil says that many of the workers' complaints arise from obsessions created by distress and that the best of way of reacting is not to appease the obsessions but to fix the underlying distress - then all kinds of problems in society just disappear.

Reforms in education would also be needed.  Weil says providing workers with high culture in a form they can suggest is much simpler than objectors expect. There is no need to try and relay large volumes of literature, as  a little pure truth lights the soul just as much as a lot of pure truth.  The relationships between various educational topics and everyday life as experienced by the workers should be explored.  Without watering down high culture, its truths should be expressed in a language "perceptible to the heart".

Weil says that to abolish urban uprootedness it will be essential to establish forms of industrial production and culture where workers could feel at home, and she discussed various reforms that she advised for France after the war

Uprootedness in the Countryside
Weil writes that though uprootedness is not as far advanced in the countryside as in towns, the needs of the peasants should receive equal attention to the need of industrial workers:  firstly because it is contrary to nature for the land to be worked by uprooted individuals and secondly as one of the causes  of the peasant's distress is the feeling that progressive movements ignore them in favour of industrial workers.

A peasant's requirements include a strong need to own land, which is important for them to feel rooted. Boredom can be a problem as many peasants do the same work throughout their lives, starting from about age 14. Weil suggests a tradition should be established for peasant youths take a few months out for travel in their late teens, similar to the tour de France that used to exist for apprentice artisans. Those who desire it should also be able to return to education for a year or two.

Rural communities require different teaching methods compared to towns. Religious teaching should be made relevant to the countryside, with emphasis on the pastoral scenes in the Bible. Science should be presented in terms of the  great natural cycles, such as the energy from the sun being captured by photosynthesis, being concentrated into seeds and fruit, passing into man and then partly returning to the soil as he expends energy working the land. Weil writes that if peasants have both well tailored scientific and religious ideas at the back of their minds while they work the fields, it will increase their appreciation of beauty and "Permeate their labour with poetry" 

In the last few pages of this section the author dwells on her central theme - that the great vocation of our times is to create a civilisation which recognises the spiritual nature of work. She draws further parallels between spiritual mechanism and physical mechanism, referring to parables in the Bible concerning seeds and then discussing our scientific understanding about how plants reach the surface by consuming the energy in their seeds and then grow upwards towards the light. Weil suggests similar parallels could be targeted for urban workers. She says if people can have both spiritual and scientific ideas converging in the act of work,  then even the fatigue associated with toil can be transformed for good, becoming  "the  pain that makes the beauty of the world  penetrates right into the core of the human body."

Weil deplores the tendency for education to train workers so they only think intellectually in their leisure hours. She says that while fundamental ideas need not be given conscious attention while workers are busy, they should always be present in the background. Weil presents the case of two women both engaged in sewing; one being a happy expectant mother, the other being a prisoner. While both have their attention occupied by the same technical problems, the pregnant woman never forgets the life growing inside her while the prisoner is always in fear of punishment. Weil says the whole social problem is mirrored in the women's contrasting attitudes. She discusses the two principal forms of greatness, the false greatness based on world conquest  and true greatness which is spiritual.

Like any elevated idea, care should be taken when promoting the union of work and spirituality lest it become discredited due to cynicism and suspicion, and thereby impossible to achieve. But Weil suggests it wouldn't need over selling by the authorities as it would be a solution to the problem on everyone's lips concerning the lack of balance created by rapidly developing material science that hasn't been matched with social or spiritual progress.  She also suggests the movement towards recognising the spirituality of work could be embraced by all section of society - it would be welcomed by progressives and conservatives alike, with even atheist communists not opposing the idea, as certain quotes from Marx deplored the lack of spirituality in the capitalist world of work - so the movement could create unity.

Uprootedness and Nationhood
At the start of this section Weil regrets the fact that the nation has become the only collective accessible to most people which is still at least partially rooted. She discusses how institutions both larger and smaller than the nation have been uprooted, such as Christendom, regional and local life, and the family. With regards to the family for example, for most people it has contracted just to the nuclear unit of man, wife and children. Brothers and sisters are already a little bit distant, with very few ever giving the slightest consideration to relatives that died more than 10 years before they were born, or to those who will be born after they have died.

Weil discusses the particular problems affecting the French that result from their unique history: the hatred of kings and distrust of all forms of central authority due to the succession of mostly cruel kings that followed Charles V;  the trend instigated by Richelieu which saw the state "sucking out all forms of life" from regional and local institutions; the distrust of religion caused by the Church siding with State; the revival in workers' spirits after the Revolution being undone by the 1871 massacre; the counter reaction that set in after World War I, because during the War the French people had exerted themselves beyond the extent provided for by the limited energies they could draw from their diminished patriotic feelings.

Various problems relating to patriotism are discussed: how some lack any patriotism at all, while for others  patriotism is too weak a motivation for the demands of wartime. Yet another problem is that for some patriotism is based on a false conception of greatness, on the success one's nation has had in conquering others - this sort of patriotism can lead people to turning a blind eye to whatever evils their country has committed. 
Weil suggests the ideal form of patriotism should be based on compassion. She compares the often antagonised and prideful feelings resulting from a patriotism based on grandeur with the warmth of a patriotism based on tender feeling of pity and an awareness of how a country is ultimately fragile and perishable.  A patriotism based on compassion allows one to still see the flaws in one's country, while still remaining ever  ready to make the ultimate sacrifice.

Part 3: The growing of Roots
The final section is concerned with the methods by which a people might be inspired towards the good, and how a nation can be encouraged to re-establish its roots. 
Weil discussed how in contrast to the explosion in knowledge regarding methods for working with materials,  folk have begun to think that there is no method for spiritual matters. She asserts that everything in creation is dependent on method, given the spiritual methods advised by St John of the Cross as an example.

Inspiring a nation is therefore a task that ought to be undertaken methodically. To accomplish the task it's essential to simultaneously point people in the direction of the good while at the same time providing the necessary motivation, so as to provide energy for the required effort. Accordingly, the methods available for inspiring a nation centre around public action by the authorities as a means of education. Weil writes this is a very difficult idea to grasp, as at least since the renaissance public action has been almost solely a means of exercising power. 
Weil enumerates five ways in which public action can serve to educate a nation:
 By raising hopes and fears with promises and threat.
 By suggestion.
 By the official expression of previously unstated thoughts already in the minds of the people.
 By example
 By the modality of the actions.
Weil considers that while the first two ways are well understood, they are unsuitable for breathing inspiration into a people. The remaining three methods could be much more effective, but at present no administration has much experience of employing them. The third method, although not without superficial similarities to the suggestive power of propaganda, can in the right circumstances be a highly effective tool for good.   Weil wrote that at the current time (writing in 1943), the French resistance authorities have a rare opportunity to inspire their people as while their actions have an official character, they are not the actual state authorities and so don't arouse the cynicism the French traditionally hold for their rulers.

Four obstacles are listed that make it difficult to inspire a people towards genuine goodness. First and foremost a false conception of greatness, based on the prestige of might and conquest. Weil opines that France was essentially still motivated by the same sense of greatness that drove Hitler. The other obstacles are idolisation of money, a degraded sense of Justice, and a lack of religious inspiration.    
Only the first  and last problem are discussed at length.

Weil asserts that prior to about the 16th century religion and science were united by the search for Truth, but have since become separated and in some cases even mutually hostile, with religion often the loser in the battle for public opinion. She suggests religion and science could become reconciled if the spirit of truth is breathed into both; despite the assertions of some scientists to the contrary, the thirst for truth is not a common motivation for science. As an example she discussed the habit of mathematicians who deliberately obscure proofs for their discoveries, showing that they were motivated by competitive instincts and the desire to be recognised above their peers. Weil suggests that the highest study of science is the beauty of the world.

In the book's last few pages Weil returns to a discussion of the spirituality of work, presenting the case that physical labour is spiritually superior to all other forms of work such as technical planning, command, art or science.

Assessment and reception

Weil's first English biographer Richard Rees has written that Need for Roots can be described as an investigation into the causes of unhappiness and proposals for its cure. Writing in 1966 he says it contains more of what the present age needs to understand and more of the criticism it needs to listen to than any other writer of the 20th century has been able to express.
According to Dr Stephen Plant, writing in 1996, Need for Roots remains just as relevant today as it was in the 1940s when the majority of European workers were employed by heavy industry.
T. S. Eliot praised the work's balanced judgement, shrewdness and good sense.

The Times Literary Supplement wrote that the book is about politics in the "widest Aristotelian understanding of the term" and that is displayed "exceptional originality and breath of human sympathy".

For Weil scholar Sian Miles the book is the most complete expression of Weil's social thought. 
Albert Camus was so taken with the work he wrote it seemed to him "impossible to imagine the rebirth of Europe  without taking into consideration the suggestions outlined in it by Simone Weil."

General De Gaulle on the other hand was less impressed, dismissing  her recommendations and only half reading most of her reports.  For the most part very few of Weils idea's were put into practice during the operations that followed the liberation of France, with one of few direct signs of her influence being that a list of obligations was included along with a list of rights in a French free press release of August 1943. 
Poet and critic Kenneth Rexroth took a negative view of the book, writing in 1957 that it "was a collection of egregious nonsense"  and "a weird, embarrassing relic of a too immediate past."

Notes and citations

References

External links
 

1949 non-fiction books
Books published posthumously
Political books
Works by Simone Weil